Gerald "Slink" Johnson (born January 31, 1973), also known by his stage name "Slink Capone", is an American actor. He starred in the sitcom Black Jesus and portrayed Lamar Davis in the 2013 video game Grand Theft Auto V.

Career

In 2021, Johnson reprised his role as Lamar alongside Shawn Fonteno (Franklin Clinton) in a live-action re-enactment of the ending cutscene of the Grand Theft Auto V mission "Franklin and Lamar," where Lamar berates (or "roasts") Franklin for his "yee-yee ass" haircut. After days of fans posting their own takes on the famous cutscene, Shawn Fonteno and Slink Johnson weighed in. The scene experienced a resurgence in popularity in late 2020 when parodies of the cutscene were uploaded on YouTube and other video hosting sites, usually involving Lamar's character model being replaced with various popular culture icons such as Darth Vader, Vegeta and Snow White among others. Later that year, Fonteno and Johnson once again reprised their roles in The Contract DLC for Grand Theft Auto Online, complete with a homage to the original roast cutscene.

Filmography

Film

Television

Video games

References

External links 
 
 

African-American male actors
Living people
African-American male comedians
American male comedians
21st-century American comedians
Place of birth missing (living people)
1973 births
21st-century African-American people
20th-century African-American people